Satondella is a genus of sea snails, marine gastropod mollusks in the family Scissurellidae.

Species
Species within the genus Satondella include:
 Satondella azonata Geiger & B.A. Marshall, 2012 
 Satondella bicristata Geiger & B.A. Marshall, 2012 
 Satondella brasiliensis (Mattar, 1987)
 Satondella cachoi Luque, Geiger & Rolán, 2011
 Satondella danieli Segers, Swinnen & Abreu, 2009
 Satondella dantarti Luque, Geiger & Rolán, 2011
 Satondella goudi Geiger, 2012
 Satondella minuta Bandel, 1998
 Satondella senni Geiger, 2003
 Satondella tabulata (Watson, 1886)

References

 Bandel K. (1998) Scissurellidae als Modell für die Variationsbreite einer natürlichen Einheit der Schlitzbandschnecken (Mollusca, Archaeogastropoda). Mitteilungen des Geologisch-Paläontologischen Instituts der Universität Hamburg, 81: 1–120.
 Geiger D.L. (2012) Monograph of the little slit shells. Volume 1. Introduction, Scissurellidae. pp. 1-728. Volume 2. Anatomidae, Larocheidae, Depressizonidae, Sutilizonidae, Temnocinclidae. pp. 729–1291. Santa Barbara Museum of Natural History Monographs Number 7.

External links
  Geiger D.L. (2003). Phylogenetic assessment of characters proposed for the generic classification of Recent Scissurellidae (Gastropoda: Vetigastropoda) with a description of one new genus and six new species from Easter Island and Australia. Molluscan Research 23:21-83
  Luque A.A., Geiger D.L. & Rolán E. (2011) A revision of the genus Satondella Bandel, 1998 (Gastropoda, Scissurellidae). Molluscan Research 31(1): 1–14

Scissurellidae